Kevin Mansker (born ) is an American male  track cyclist. He competed in the sprint event at the 2012 UCI Track Cycling World Championships.

References

External links
 Profile at cyclingarchives.com

1989 births
Living people
American track cyclists
American male cyclists
Place of birth missing (living people)